Hawkeye is an American television miniseries created by Jonathan Igla for the streaming service Disney+, based on Marvel Comics featuring the characters Clint Barton / Hawkeye and Kate Bishop / Hawkeye. It is the fifth television series in the Marvel Cinematic Universe (MCU) produced by Marvel Studios, sharing continuity with the films of the franchise and taking place after the events of the film Avengers: Endgame (2019). It sees Clint Barton as he partners with Kate Bishop to confront enemies from his past in order to be with his family in time for Christmas. Igla served as head writer with Rhys Thomas leading the directing team.

Jeremy Renner reprises his role as Clint Barton from the film series, with Hailee Steinfeld joining him as Kate Bishop. Tony Dalton, Fra Fee, Brian d'Arcy James, Aleks Paunovic, Piotr Adamczyk, Linda Cardellini, Simon Callow, Vera Farmiga, Alaqua Cox, Zahn McClarnon, Florence Pugh, and Vincent D'Onofrio also star. Marvel Studios was developing a limited series for Disney+ centered on Hawkeye by April 2019, with Renner returning. The series was officially announced that July and Igla joined in September, with Steinfeld unofficially attached at that point. Thomas and Bert & Bertie joined as directors in July 2020 and filming began in New York City that December. Steinfeld and additional cast members were confirmed, and filming concluded in late April 2021. Additional shooting took place in Atlanta, Georgia. Matt Fraction and David Aja's Hawkeye comic run served as a major influence on the series.

Hawkeye premiered with its first two episodes on November 24, 2021, and ran for six episodes, concluding on December 22. It is part of Phase Four of the MCU. The series received positive reviews, with critics highlighting the action sequences and the chemistry between Renner and Steinfeld. A spin-off series, Echo, focusing on Cox's character Maya Lopez / Echo, is scheduled to be released as part of Phase Five.

Premise 
One year after the events of Avengers: Endgame (2019), Clint Barton must partner with Kate Bishop to confront enemies from his past as the Ronin in order to get back to his family in time for Christmas.

Cast and characters 

 Jeremy Renner as Clint Barton / Hawkeye:A master archer and a former Avenger and agent of S.H.I.E.L.D. The series further explores the character's time as Ronin, as first shown in Avengers: Endgame (2019). Renner said that meeting Kate Bishop brings "an onslaught of problems" into Barton's life, as Barton does not understand her obsession with him. Director Rhys Thomas felt Barton had a compelling "strength of character" that exists "hidden underneath an imperfect and complex surface".
 Hailee Steinfeld as Kate Bishop:A 22-year-old Hawkeye fan who becomes Barton's protégée and is trained to take over the mantle of Hawkeye. Bishop idolizes Barton because she realizes she could train to be like him one day. She draws the attention of Barton by masquerading as Ronin. Steinfeld described Bishop as "smart and witty" and a "badass", with physical abilities that are "through the roof", while Renner said she has "a wonderfully annoying and equally charming manner about her". Director Bert described Bishop as "full of rookie energy; she's feisty and strong-willed with a deep desire to prove herself" and "a refreshing confidence", as well as the "comedy foil" to Barton's straight man. Steinfeld learned archery because Bishop is "self-taught" and felt it was an important aspect of her character since she idolizes Barton. Clara Stack plays a young Kate Bishop.
 Tony Dalton as Jack Duquesne:Eleanor's new fiancé and Armand's nephew. The character does not serve as Barton's mentor in the series as he does in the comics. Dalton believed his reputation for portraying antagonistic roles helped conceal the twist of his character's non-antagonistic nature.
 Fra Fee as Kazimierz "Kazi" Kazimierczak:A mercenary for the Tracksuit Mafia. Fee described Kazi as having a "deep sense of loyalty" towards the Mafia but also some frustration at not having a higher position in the gang. He learned American Sign Language for the role. Phoenix Crepin portrays a younger Kazi.
 Brian d'Arcy James as Derek Bishop: Kate's deceased father.
 Aleks Paunovic as Ivan Banionis: An enforcer for the Tracksuit Mafia.
 Piotr Adamczyk as Tomas Delgado: An enforcer for the Tracksuit Mafia.
 Linda Cardellini as Laura Barton: Clint's wife and a former agent of S.H.I.E.L.D.
 Simon Callow as Armand Duquesne III: Jack's uncle.
 Vera Farmiga as Eleanor Bishop: Kate's mother and the CEO of Bishop Security.
 Alaqua Cox as Maya Lopez: The deaf commander of the Tracksuit Mafia. Darnell Besaw, Cox's cousin, plays a young Maya Lopez.
 Zahn McClarnon as William Lopez: Maya's deceased father and a former commander of the Tracksuit Mafia.
 Florence Pugh as Yelena Belova:A highly trained spy and assassin who is hunting Barton for his supposed role in her sister Natasha Romanoff's death. Pugh said that Belova is continuing "what she's good at, and despite her sister not being there, she's back working", though her mission to hunt Barton "sets up a whole different challenge".
 Vincent D'Onofrio as Wilson Fisk / Kingpin:A crime lord in New York who Eleanor has connections with. D'Onofrio reprises his role from the Marvel Television series Daredevil (2015–2018). On Kingpin's portrayal in the series, directors Bert & Bertie said they wanted to take into account the character's presence that was established in Daredevil. D'Onofrio considered the role a continuation of his portrayal in Daredevil, with a difference in physical strength but still operating "through the pain of his childhood". He played the character considering that Fisk had regained power after losing status during the Blip. He added that the portrayal was "done with an eye on connecting as many dots from Daredevil to Hawkeye as possible", but acknowledged that some aspects, such as his enhanced physical strength, could not connect back.

Recurring in the series are Carlos Navarro as Enrique, an enforcer for the Tracksuit Mafia; Ben Sakamoto, Ava Russo, and Cade Woodward reprising their respective roles as Barton's children Cooper, Lila, and Nathaniel from prior MCU films; Jolt, a golden retriever, playing Lucky the Pizza Dog; Clayton English, Adetinpo Thomas, Robert Walker-Branchaud, and Adelle Drahos respectively as Grills, Wendy, Orville, and Missy, all NYC LARPers who befriend and help Barton and Bishop; and Ivan Mbakop as NYPD Detective Caudle.

Also appearing are Jonathan Bergman as Armand VII, the grandson of Armand III, and Franco Castan as Detective Rivera, a member of the NYPD. The fictional Steve Rogers / Captain America musical within the series, Rogers: The Musical, sees stage actors portray Thor (Jason Scott McDonald), Loki (Jordan Chin), Rogers (Tom Feeney), Bruce Banner / Hulk (Harris Turner), Barton (Avery Gillham), Romanoff (Meghan Manning), Tony Stark / Iron Man (Aaron Nedrick), Scott Lang / Ant-Man (Nico DeJesus), and Chitauri warriors. Adam Pascal cameos as Lead Citizen in the musical. Newscaster Pat Kiernan appears as himself.

Episodes

Production

Development 
By September 2018, Marvel Studios was developing several limited series for its parent company Disney's streaming service, Disney+, to be centered on "second tier" characters from the Marvel Cinematic Universe (MCU) films who had not and were unlikely to star in their own films. By April 2019, development of an adventure series starring Jeremy Renner as his MCU film character Clint Barton / Hawkeye had begun. The plot was expected to follow Barton as he bequeaths the mantle of Hawkeye to Kate Bishop. Feige was set to produce the limited series, which would run for six to eight episodes. Renner had originally signed on to star in a standalone feature film focused on his character, but agreed to star in a series instead after Feige decided to redevelop the project for Disney+. Executive producer Trinh Tran explained that a six-hour series gave Marvel more room to explore Barton's backstory, introduce Bishop, and develop the dynamic between the two characters that appeals to fans of the comics, all of which would have been restricted by a film's two hour runtime. Feige officially announced Hawkeye at San Diego Comic-Con in July.

In September 2019, Jonathan Igla was revealed to be serving as the series' head writer. Amy Berg had also been a contender for head writer. In July 2020, Rhys Thomas was hired to direct three episodes for the series, and to serve as an executive producer, with filmmaking duo Bert & Bertie hired to direct the other three. Borys Kit at The Hollywood Reporter felt hiring these directors indicated the series could have a "light-hearted tone", given the past work from each. Brad Winderbaum, Victoria Alonso, and Louis D'Esposito also serve as executive producers. The series consists of six episodes. Budgets for each episode were reported to be as much as $25 million.

Writing 

Elisa Climent, Katie Mathewson, Tanner Bean, Erin Cancino, Heather Quinn, and Jenna Noel Frazier serve as writers on the series. Quinn served as the on-set writer during filming. When officially announcing the series, Feige and Renner said the series would follow Barton as he teaches Bishop to be a "superhero without superpowers", and would explore more of Barton's time as the vigilante Ronin that was first established in Avengers: Endgame (2019). In October 2019, Tran said the series would explore Barton's past, and confirmed that the mantle of Hawkeye would be passed to Bishop. Igla hoped the series would show a more humorous side of the character while further exploring his mentorship role from previous appearances. Hawkeye is influenced by Matt Fraction's run with the character in the comics, and adapts elements such as Lucky the Pizza Dog, a golden retriever who is a companion to Barton and Bishop; the Tracksuit Mafia; and Barton's hearing loss. Igla declared himself a fan of that title, which he read while working on Mad Men, for its approach in telling what a superhero does in his off days, as well as a "comforting and relaxing" nature he likened to the Christmas films from the Hallmark Channel. The influence was also seen in how Barton has a "lightheartedness" to him that was not seen in his past appearances, and the desire to highlight the "bond and partnership" between him and Bishop, despite Renner's version of the character being different from the comics version, including the banter the two have in Fraction's run. Fraction served as a consultant for the series, and had planned to make a cameo appearance as a Tracksuit Mafia member before the COVID-19 pandemic prevented this.

Hawkeye is set in New York City around the Christmas season of 2024, one year following the events of Avengers: Endgame, with Tran noting that many, but not all, of New York's citizens have "recuperated and continued thriving" following the Blip. Renner described the series as being set in the "current" MCU, while occurring over the course of about a week. Thomas noted that it had been discussed during development to set the series two years after Endgame in 2025. Further discussing the holiday setting, Tran said it "made sense" to have Barton's story set during that time since he would be focused on spending Christmas with his family after losing them during the Blip, and the "holiday spirit" would provide a "different atmosphere and environment" that would contrast to Barton's serious demeanor.

Casting 
With the series' official announcement in July 2019, Renner was confirmed to be starring in the series as Barton. By early September 2019, Hailee Steinfeld had been offered the role of Kate Bishop, but had not yet signed on for the series a month later. Variety reported one reason for this was a non-compete clause in her contract with Apple TV+ for starring in the series Dickinson, something Variety felt Steinfeld would be able to negotiate out of. No other actresses had been approached for the role of Bishop. When asked about her starring in the series shortly after, Steinfeld said it was "not something that's necessarily happening", but she was confirmed as Bishop in December 2020. Tran explained that Steinfeld was never out of contention for the role but Marvel Studios was unable to discuss her involvement until the official announcement and had spent the time since the initial reports attempting to work out how the series could be made with Steinfeld while still being ready for release during the 2021 holiday season.

Additional cast members also announced in December 2020 were Vera Farmiga as Eleanor Bishop, Florence Pugh as Yelena Belova / Black Widow, Fra Fee as Kazimierz "Kazi" Kazimierczak, Tony Dalton as Jack Duquesne, Alaqua Cox as Maya Lopez / Echo, Zahn McClarnon as William Lopez, and Brian d'Arcy James as Derek Bishop. Pugh reprises her role from Black Widow (2021), which has a post-credits scene in which Belova is tasked by Valentina Allegra de Fontaine to hunt Barton for his role in her sister Natasha Romanoff's death. Pugh's Belova was included in the series after Igla suggested it as the "right place for her next chapter", with the series' directors attending an early screening of Black Widow to better understand Belova. Devin Grayson and J. G. Jones, who co-created Belova, had expected to receive $2,000 per episode for her appearance in the series due to a 2007 agreement with Marvel Comics, but ultimately received $300 per episode due to a provision in the contract which allowed Marvel to reduce creators' payments. Dalton was cast after Tran was impressed with his performance in the series Better Call Saul. The same month, set photos revealed that Ben Sakamoto, Ava Russo, and Cade Woodward would reprise their respective roles in the series as Barton's children Cooper, Lila, and Nathaniel from previous MCU films. Linda Cardellini was revealed to be reprising her role as Barton's wife Laura in October 2021. Aleks Paunovic and Piotr Adamczyk also star in the series as Ivan and Tomas, respectively, members of the Tracksuit Mafia, along with Simon Callow as Armand Duquesne III, and Vincent D'Onofrio as Wilson Fisk / Kingpin, reprising the role from the Marvel Television series Daredevil (2015–2018). The idea to include Kingpin in the series was suggested by Feige when the producers held a virtual reunion in which they discussed the identity of the series' main villain; he wanted to include the character due to his connections with the NYC underworld in the comics.

Design 

The series' main title sequence was designed by Perception. Marvel Studios requested that the first episode feature an opening title sequence to chronicle Bishop's story in the years between her appearances before and after the main titles, while the five other episodes featured main-on-end title sequences. Perception utilized monochromatic silhouettes to represent different characters and elements, and paid homage to David Aja's Hawkeye comic book illustrations.

Filming 
Filming began in early December 2020 in New York City, with Rhys Thomas and Bert & Bertie directing, with Eric Steelberg and James Whitaker serving as cinematographers. The series was filmed under the working title Anchor Point. Filming took place in Downtown Brooklyn including at the Hoyt–Schermerhorn Streets subway station, and in Manhattan in Washington Square Park, Midtown, Hell's Kitchen, the East Village, and the Lotte New York Palace Hotel. Set photos also indicated the series would occur during the Christmas season and feature a Christmas party. Additional filming took place at Trilith Studios and Tyler Perry Studios in Atlanta, Georgia. On February 22, 2021, filming began in downtown Canton, Georgia, for a week, continuing in the area between March 4 and 5. Filming wrapped on April 21. Reshoots occurred at Stratagem Studios in Toronto, Canada, from September 7 to 9.

Post-production 
Terel Gibson, Rosanne Tan, and Tim Roche serve as editors. Visual effects were created by Industrial Light & Magic, Luma Pictures, Mr. X, Rise, Rising Sun Pictures, and Weta Digital.

Music 
Christophe Beck was revealed to be composing the score for the series in September 2021, after previously doing so for Ant-Man (2015), Ant-Man and the Wasp (2018), and WandaVision (2021). He was joined by Michael Paraskevas as co-composer. The score was recorded at Synchron Stage Vienna.

The episodes "Never Meet Your Heroes" and "So This Is Christmas?" feature a musical number from the fictional Broadway musical Rogers: The Musical titled "Save the City", centered on the Battle of New York and written by Marc Shaiman and Scott Wittman. It was released as a single on November 24, and is included on the Vol. 2 soundtrack for the series. The score for the first three episodes was released on December 10, while the score for the last three episodes was released on December 22.

Marketing 
Concept art for the series featuring designs of the characters' costumes was included in Expanding the Universe, a Marvel Studios special that debuted on Disney+ on November 12, 2019. A trailer was released on September 13, 2021. Jeremy Mathai at /Film said everything in the teaser looked "shockingly delightful—from the laid-back, comedic tone" to the chemistry between Steinfeld and Renner. He was enthused about the low-stakes of the series' story with Barton trying to get home for Christmas. Chaim Gartenberg of The Verge was drawn to the teaser's "surprisingly light tone" and felt the series would draw elements from the Christmas films Home Alone (1990) and Die Hard (1988). NME Sam Warner described the teaser as a "festive first look" at the series, and noted the use of the song "It's the Most Wonderful Time of the Year". Stephen Iervolino of Good Morning America said the teaser was a blend of "action, humor and downright 007-looking spy scenes". Ryan Parker, writing for The Hollywood Reporter, noted the unique tone of the teaser that presented the series as "more of a comedy, holiday romp, albeit with a ton of action". Entertainment Weekly Christian Holub felt the Christmas setting added a "Home Alone-like vibe" to the series and noted the teaser's many references to the comics, particularly Fraction's run. The series official poster was released at the end of October, with John Lutz of Collider noting the further inspiration of Fraction's run in the costumes worn by Barton and Bishop on the poster and the colors used, as well as the series' logo.

An episode of the series Marvel Studios: Legends was released on November 12, 2021, for Disney+'s "Disney+ Day" celebration, exploring Barton using footage of his MCU film appearances. Additionally, an extended scene was released on Disney+ Day. In January 2021, Marvel announced their "Marvel Must Haves" program, which reveals new toys, games, books, apparel, home decor, and other merchandise related to each episode of Hawkeye following an episode's release. The first "Must Haves" merchandise for the episodes started on November 26, 2021.

Release 
Hawkeye debuted its first two episodes on Disney+ on November 24, 2021. The remaining four episodes were released weekly, concluding on December 22. It is part of Phase Four of the MCU. A premiere screening was held in London on November 11, 2021, as well as on November 17 at the El Capitan Theatre in Los Angeles.

Reception

Critical response 

The review aggregator website Rotten Tomatoes reports a 92% approval rating with an average rating of 7.55/10, based on 174 reviews. The site's critical consensus reads, "Hawkeye starts slowly, but the street-level action is a refreshing change of pace for the MCU—and the chemistry between its leads sparkles even when the plot lags." Metacritic, which uses a weighted average, assigned a score of 66 out of 100 based on 27 critics, indicating "generally favorable reviews".

Andrew Webster of The Verge felt that Hawkeye was "a few different things", adding: "It's a chance to spend more time with one of the lesser-known Avengers, it's an origin story for an up-and-coming hero, and it's a detective drama set amidst the backdrop of Christmas in New York City as the MCU adds yet another genre to its all-enveloping fold." He considered it alongside WandaVision and Loki as the best of the MCU on Disney+. Writing for Empire, Laura Sirikul gave the series four out of five stars and described it as "charming and full of heart".  Richard Trenholm of CNET gave the series a positive review while noting that "Overall, Hawkeye isn't a tortured antihero searching for redemption, he's still just affable Jeremy Renner trundling around looking grumpy. And the show mostly knows this, sticking him into action scenes that are more playful than perilous. Episode 2 in particular has both Clint and Kate engaged in mock combat that's fun to watch rather than hazardous to their health, a jaunty twist on the gritty action-scene-every-episode formula."

Polly Conway of Common Sense Media rated the miniseries 4 out of 5 stars and praised the depiction of positive messages and role models, writing, "Hard work, perseverance, and courage are all clear themes. You are not defined solely by your past choices and mistakes. [...] Although they have to make many sacrifices to do so, the heroes are fighting for the greater good. They demonstrate courage, teamwork, and perseverance." Ben Travers of IndieWire gave the series a "C−", feeling that it was "more concerned with setting up Kate Bishop for future MCU phases than creating a problem worthy of two heroes' time".

Accolades 
The series was given the Seal of Authentic Representation from the Ruderman Family Foundation for Cox's role as Maya Lopez. The seal is given to films and series that feature actors with disabilities who have at least five lines of dialogue. The series was also one of 200 television series that received the ReFrame Stamp for the years 2021 to 2022. The stamp is awarded by the gender equity coalition ReFrame and industry database IMDbPro for film and television projects that are proven to have gender-balanced hiring, with stamps being awarded to projects that hire female-identifying people, especially women of color, in four out of eight key roles for their production.

Emmy Awards campaign 
By April 2022, Marvel Studios and Disney planned to submit Hawkeye in the various limited series categories for the Primetime Emmy Awards, but ultimately submitted the series for Outstanding Comedy Series and related comedy categories. Commentators felt this change opened up the possibility for the series to receive a second season.

Documentary special 

In February 2021, the documentary series Marvel Studios: Assembled was announced. The specials go behind the scenes of the MCU films and television series with cast members and additional creatives. The special on this series, Assembled: The Making of Hawkeye, featuring Renner, was released on Disney+ on February 9, 2022. It was originally intended to release on January 19, 2022.

Spin-off 

A spin-off series starring Alaqua Cox as Maya Lopez / Echo was in early development for Disney+ by March 2021, with Etan Cohen and Emily Cohen set to write and executive produce. Echo was later officially announced in November, when Marion Dayre was revealed to be serving as head writer. Sydney Freeland and Catriona McKenzie direct the series. McClarnon and D'Onofrio reprise their roles from Hawkeye, and are joined by Charlie Cox as Matt Murdock / Daredevil, reprising his role from past MCU media. Chaske Spencer, Tantoo Cardinal, Devery Jacobs, Cody Lightning, and Graham Greene also star. Echo is scheduled to be released as part of Phase Five.

Notes

References

External links 

 
 
 

 
2020s American crime television series
2020s American television miniseries
2021 American television series debuts
2021 American television series endings
American action adventure television series
Christmas television series
Disney+ original programming
English-language television shows
Marvel Cinematic Universe: Phase Four television series
Superheroine television shows
Television series about archery
Television series about revenge
Television series by Marvel Studios
Television series set in 2024
Television shows about deaf people
Television shows based on works by Stan Lee
Television shows filmed at Trilith Studios
Television shows filmed in Atlanta
Television shows filmed in Georgia (U.S. state)
Television shows filmed in New York City
Television shows filmed in Toronto
Television shows set in New York City